The University of Notre Dame Australia (UNDA) is a national Roman Catholic private university with campuses in  and  in Western Australia and Sydney in New South Wales. The university also has eight clinical schools as part of its school of medicine located across Sydney and Melbourne and also in regional New South Wales and Victoria.

Until 2021, Notre Dame was not part of the Western Australia Tertiary Institutions Service Centre (TISC) nor the New South Wales Universities Admissions Centre, and students applied directly to the university through its admissions process. In July 2021, Notre Dame partnered with TISC to take applications for undergraduate courses in Western Australia through TISC.

The university crest is an open Bible. The waves below the open Bible represent the Fremantle area, where the university was founded, and Australia, a nation surrounded by water.

In the 2019 Student Experience Survey, the University of Notre Dame Australia recorded the second highest student satisfaction rating out of all Australian universities, and the highest student satisfaction rating out of all Western Australian based universities, with an overall satisfaction rating of 88.

History
In 1945, Father Patrick Duffy, an American navy chaplain, met Cardinal Norman Thomas Gilroy, Archbishop of Sydney, to discuss the possibility of the University of Notre Dame and the Congregation of Holy Cross being involved in the establishment of the first private Catholic university in Australia.

At the time, there were roughly 1.5 million Catholics living in Australia and an established network of Catholic primary and secondary schools. Cardinal Gilroy believed that there was a strong appetite for a Catholic university and that it would enable the education of an "elite Catholic laity that had been the glory of the church in the United States".

The project was pursued for a number of years and property was purchased in Sydney on behalf of Holy Cross in 1948, but ultimately the charter to establish the university was never acquired and the endeavour was abandoned in 1953.

In the mid-1980s, concerns were raised that state universities were not able to properly train lay teachers to work in Catholic primary and secondary schools in Western Australia. The idea of a private Catholic university again surfaced, this time on the opposite side of the Australian continent.

Peter Tannock, who headed the Catholic Education Office of Western Australia, discussed these concerns with William Foley, Archbishop of Perth. They enlisted the help of Denis Horgan, a local Catholic businessman and founder of Leeuwin Estate, who they hoped would provide financial assistance in establishing the university.

Horgan was supportive of the idea, as long as the institution would provide more than teacher education. A small planning committee with Tannock, Horgan, Foley and Michael Quinlan, a Catholic physician, was established and developed the plan for a Catholic university with a number of sites in Western Australia that would provide medical and nursing education among other fields.

The university was created through the University of Notre Dame Australia Act 1989 in the Parliament of Western Australia. The act was given assent on 9 January 1990, the university was inaugurated on 2 July 1991 and classes commenced in February 1992. The first college, the College of Education, had 35 postgraduate students in its first year and the University of Notre Dame (US) sent 25 study abroad students to spend a semester at the Fremantle campus.

The Broome campus, originally known as the Kimberley Centre, was opened in 1994 in service of the church and Aboriginal communities in the Kimberley region. In 2006, the Sydney campus was formally opened with an initial enrollment of 450 students.

Campuses 

Notre Dame has campuses located in Fremantle and Broome in Western Australia. The university's Sydney campus is spread across two sitesone based in Broadway and the other in  adjacent to St Vincent's Hospital.

The Fremantle campus is located in the historic West End of the city, a designated heritage precinct famous for its late Georgian and Victorian-style architecture. The university has rejuvenated much of the West End and has worked to restore the traditional architecture of the precinct, occupying 50 properties since its establishment in 1992 and restoring many buildings. Due to the presence of Notre Dame, Fremantle is seeking to be referred to as a "university town", much like older university towns in Europe and to be the only one of its kind in Australia.

The School of Medicine Sydney has eight clinical schools in Sydney, Melbourne and in rural locations across the east coast.

The Sydney Clinical School is located across St Vincent's & Mater Clinical School at St Vincent's Hospital, Auburn Clinical School at Auburn Hospital and Hawkesbury Clinical School at Hawkesbury Health Service. The Melbourne Clinical School is located at the Werribee Mercy Hospital.

The rural clinical schools are located at the Lithgow Clinical School at Lithgow Hospital, the Ballarat Clinical School at St John of God Hospital Ballarat, the Riverina Regional Training Hub (RRTH) and the Wagga Wagga Clinical School at Calvary Health Care Riverina.

Organisation and administration 
The university has three campuses offering courses in the following schools:

 School of Arts and Sciences (Broome, Fremantle and Sydney)
 School of Business (Fremantle and Sydney)
 School of Education (Broome, Fremantle and Sydney)
 School of Health Sciences (Fremantle)
 School of Law (Fremantle and Sydney)
 School of Medicine (Fremantle and Sydney)
 School of Nursing and Midwifery (Broome and Fremantle); School of Nursing (Sydney)
 School of Philosophy and Theology (Broome, Fremantle and Sydney)
 School of Physiotherapy (Fremantle)

The university is a self-accrediting institution and is subject to regular quality audits and registration processes undertaken by the Tertiary Education Quality and Standards Agency.

The governance structure of Notre Dame is determined largely by its enabling act of parliament and its statutes. These specify the source, role and functions of its trustees, board of directors and board of governors and the principal officers and academic leaders of the university.

Academics 
All undergraduate students must undertake courses in theology, philosophy and ethics. This is known as the core curriculum in Fremantle, and the LOGOS program in Sydney.

Notre Dame's medicine students study a core course, bioethics, whilst students on the Broome campus study Aboriginal people and spirituality as part of their degree.

Rankings
The Australian Government's Quality Indicators for Learning and Teaching 2018 Student Experience Survey results place Notre Dame as one of the top universities in Australia.

Research 
Notre Dame has three institutes for scholarship and research located across its campuses.
 The Institute for Health Research (Fremantle campus)
 Nulungu Research Institute (Broome campus)
 The Institute for Ethics and Society (Sydney campus)

The Institute for Health Research draws on the clinical expertise within Notre Dame's Schools of Health Sciences, Medicine, Nursing & Midwifery and Physiotherapy to develop research partnerships and projects that support the healthy ageing of all Australians. Nulungu collaborates with national and international universities, government and Indigenous Australian communities to develop research outcomes of benefit to the country's Aboriginal and Torres Strait Islander peoples. It was established by Lyn Henderson-Yates, who herself is an indigenous Australian and is also vice-chancellor of the university's Broome campus. The Institute for Ethics and Society pursues philosophical and interdisciplinary research across five core areas: applied and professional ethics; ethics education; bioethics; religion and global society; and Indigenous research and ethics.

The university is one of the partners in the  Western Australian Pregnancy Cohort (Raine) Study, one of the largest cohorts of pregnancy, childhood, adolescence and  early adulthood to be carried out anywhere in the world.

Student life 

The Sydney and Fremantle campuses both have representative student associations, created to represent all the students at each campus. The Sydney campus is home to the Student Association of the University of Notre Dame Australia (SAUNDA), while the Fremantle Campus hosts the Notre Dame Student Association (NDSA). These organisations are currently not recognised in the university statues, making them student associations and not guilds.

The Catholic Mass is celebrated each weekday and on Sunday evening at the Fremantle campus, weekdays on the Sydney campus, and on Wednesdays at the Broome campus.

The student population across Australia at Notre Dame campuses numbers 12,394 as of February 2018, 6,544 of these being in Fremantle, 5,685 in Sydney and 165 in Broome.

Libraries
Notre Dame has six individual libraries across the three campuses: St Teresa's Library, Galvin Medical Library and the Craven Law Library at the Fremantle campus; Benedict XVI Medical Library (Darlinghurst) and St Benedict's Library (Broadway) at the Sydney campus; and the Broome Campus Library at the Broome campus.

St Teresa's Library 
St Teresa's Library, located at 34 Mouat Street, Fremantle, is a heritage listed building in the West End and supports the programs of the Schools of Arts & Sciences, Business, Education and Philosophy & Theology. Built on land first owned by John Bateman, the building was originally a warehouse for Bateman Hardware. The building was first adapted to become a university library in 1994 when only limited, low cost adaptive re-use works could be afforded, and was renovated again in 2011 to provide maximum floor area.

Galvin Medical Library 
Galvin Medical Library, located at 38–40 Henry Street, Fremantle, is contained within the School of Medicine, a heritage listed building. The library supports the Schools of Medicine, Nursing, Physiotherapy and Health Sciences. Constructed from 1900 onward, the building was known as Fowler's Warehouse and served as the principal premises in Western Australia for D. & J. Fowler Ltd., the wholesale grocery company. The library was opened in 2005 after Notre Dame took over the lease of the buildings from the City of Fremantle.

Craven Law Library 
Like St Teresa's Library, Craven Law Library is located in the former Bateman family warehouse complex between Mouat and Henry Streets in Fremantle. The library was established in 1997, but renamed the Craven Law Library in 2003 to commemorate the foundation dean of the School of Law, Greg Craven. The library supports the School of Law and contains a print collection in excess of 30,000 volumes, including historic primary materials.

Benedict XVI Medical Library 
The Benedict XVI Medical Library, located at 160 Oxford Street, Darlinghurst, is housed next to the Sacred Heart Catholic Church in a building originally occupied by a Catholic school run by the Sisters of Charity of Australia. The building was taken over by Notre Dame in 2004–05 and supports the Schools of Medicine and Nursing. It was named in honour of Pope Benedict XVI during a visit he made to the university and library on 18 July 2008.

Notable people 

The current and fifth chancellor of the university, serving since 2017, is Chris Ellison, a Western Australia-based former senator. The vice-chancellor and chief executive officer of the university from 2008 until February 2019 was Celia Hammond, a former lawyer who resigned to seek election to federal parliament. The next vice-chancellor is Francis Campbell (commencing February 2020).

Chancellors

Vice-chancellors

Notable alumni

 Lucy Chaffer – Australian skeleton racer
 Fantine – Russian-born Australian multilingual singer/songwriter
 Ricky Grace – Former Perth Wildcats player
 James Griffin – Australian politician
 Emily Hamilton – Australian politician
 Graham Joseph Hill, former principal of Stirling Theological College
 Toby Kane – Australian Paralympic alpine skier
 Matt Keogh – Australian politician
 Marty Roebuck – Former Australian rugby union footballer
 Kylie Sturgess – Educator, lecturer and podcaster

See also 

 List of universities in Australia
 Rural Clinical School of Western Australia
 Kenvale College of Tourism & Hospitality Management, an institution with an articulation agreement with the University of Notre Dame, Sydney

References

External links

 
Universities in Western Australia
Catholic universities and colleges in Australia
Buildings and structures in Fremantle
Educational institutions established in 1989
1989 establishments in Australia
Association of Catholic Colleges and Universities
Notre Dame Australia